Entre Campos station is part of the Yellow Line of the Lisbon Metro.

History
It is one of the 11 stations that belong to the original Lisbon Metro network, and opened on December 29, 1959. This station is located on Avenida da República. Its name reflects its location, between Campo Grande and Campo Pequeno.

The architectural design of the original station is by Falcão e Cunha. On July 15, 1973, the station was extended, based on the architectural design of Dinies Gomes. On December 11, 1993, the station was refurbished, based on the architectural design of Sanchez Jorge.

Connections

Urban buses

Carris 
 207 Cais do Sodré ⇄ Fetais
 727 Estação Roma-Areeiro ⇄ Restelo - Av. das Descobertas 
 736 Cais do Sodré ⇄ Odivelas (Bairro Dr. Lima Pimentel)
 738 Quinta dos Barros ⇄ Alto de Santo Amaro
 744 Marquês de Pombal ⇄ Moscavide (Quinta das Laranjeiras)
 749 ISEL ⇄ Estação Entrecampos
 754 Campo Pequeno ⇄ Alfragide
 783 Amoreiras (Centro Comercial) ⇄ Portela - Rua Mouzinho de Albuquerque

Aerobus 
 Linha 2 Aeroporto ⇄ Sete Rios

Rail

Comboios de Portugal 
 Sintra ⇄ Lisboa - Oriente
 Sintra ⇄ Alverca
 Alcântara-Terra ⇄ Castanheira do Ribatejo
 Alcântara-Terra ⇄ Azambuja
 Lisboa - Santa Apolónia ⇄ Leiria (Regional)
 Lisboa - Santa Apolónia ⇄ Caldas da Rainha (Regional, InterRegional)
 Lisboa - Santa Apolónia ⇄ Torres Vedras (Regional)
 Lisboa - Oriente ⇄ Évora (InterCity)
 Lisboa - Oriente ⇄ Faro (InterCity)
 Porto - Campanhã ⇄ Faro (Alfa Pendular)

Fertagus 
 Setúbal ⇄ Roma-Areeiro
 Coina ⇄ Roma-Areeiro

See also
 List of Lisbon metro stations

References

External links

Yellow Line (Lisbon Metro) stations
Railway stations opened in 1959